The 7th Arabian Gulf Cup took place in Muscat capital of Oman, from March 9, to March 28, 1984. Iraq won this tournament after beating Qatar in the decisive match between the two teams. Both Iraq and Qatar had finished with the same count of points at the round robin tournament earlier. Iraqi Players Hussein Saeed scored seven goals, to become Topscorer, Saeed was also selected as best player of the tournament along Oman's Ghulam Khamis.

Matches

 Play-Off

Result

References

External links 
 Official Site (Arabic)

 

1984
1984
1984 in Asian football
1983–84 in Iraqi football
1983–84 in Saudi Arabian football
1983–84 in Emirati football
1983–84 in Kuwaiti football
1983–84 in Qatari football
1983–84 in Bahraini football
1983–84 in Omani football